Harris is an unincorporated community in Elkins Township, Washington County, Arkansas, United States. It is located east of Fayetteville and within the city limits of Elkins near Arkansas Highway 16.

A post office was established at Harris in 1888, and remained in operation until 1957.

References

Unincorporated communities in Washington County, Arkansas
Unincorporated communities in Arkansas